The Brush Park Historic District is a neighborhood located in Detroit, Michigan. It is bounded by Mack Avenue on the north, Woodward Avenue on the west, Beaubien Street on the east, and the Fisher Freeway on the south. The Woodward East Historic District, a smaller historic district completely encompassed by the larger Brush Park neighborhood, is located on Alfred, Edmund, and Watson Streets, from Brush Street to John R. Street, and is recognized by the National Register of Historic Places.

Originally part of a French ribbon farm, Brush Park was developed beginning in the 1850s as an upscale residential neighborhood for Detroit's elite citizens by entrepreneur Edmund Askin Brush. Dozens of Victorian mansions were built there during the final decades of the nineteenth century, and Brush Park was nicknamed "Little Paris" due to its elegant architecture. The neighborhood's heyday didn't last long, however: by the early twentieth century most of is affluent residents started moving to more modern, quieter districts, and Brush Park was quickly populated by members of Detroit's fast-growing working class. Severely affected by depopulation, blight and crime during the 1970s and 1980s, the neighborhood is currently experiencing restorations of its historic buildings and luring new residents.

History

Early years

The land now occupied by the Brush Park district was originally part of a ribbon farm dating back to the French colonial period, initially conceded by Charles de la Boische, Marquis de Beauharnois to Laurence Eustache Gamelin for military services on May 1, 1747. The farm had a frontage of two arpents (about 386 feet) on the Detroit River, and extended back into the interior eighty arpents; it was bounded on the west by the Commons (Domaine du Roy), and on the east by the farm of Jean Baptiste Beaubien. After the death of its second owner, Jacques Pilet, the farm was acquired by the prominent Barthe family, and in the late eighteenth century John Askin, an Irish fur trader and land speculator, obtained it through marriage with Marie-Archange Barthe. In 1802, Askin's daughter Adelaide married Elijah Brush, a Vermont lawyer who would soon become Detroit's second mayor from its first incorporation; on October 31, 1806, Elijah purchased the farm – legally designated as "Private Claim 1" – for $6000.

Beginning in the 1850s, entrepreneur Edmund Askin Brush, son of Elijah, began developing his family's property, located conveniently close to downtown, into a neighborhood for Detroit's elite citizens. The first street, named after Colonel John Winder, was opened in 1852; the other streets followed soon afterwards (Adelaide in 1853, Alfred in 1869, Edmund in 1867) and were mainly named after members of the Brush family. The area was developed with care: the land directly facing Woodward Avenue was subdivided into large and expensive lots, soon occupied by religious buildings and opulent mansions rivaling those built along East Jefferson Avenue and West Fort Street, while the land to the east was partitioned into relatively smaller, fifty feet wide parcels. Severe restrictions required the construction of high-end, elegant mansions, giving a uniform and exclusive character to the neighborhood. In the late 19th century, Brush Park became known as the "Little Paris of the Midwest."

Architects who designed these mansions included Julius Hess, Henry T. Brush, George D. Mason, Gordon W Lloyd, Elijah E Myers, Martin A Edwards George W. Nettleton, and Albert Kahn. Homes were built in Brush Park beginning in the 1860s and peaking in the 1870s and 1880s; one of the last homes built was constructed in 1906 by Albert Kahn for his personal use. Other early residents of Brush Park included lumber baron David Whitney Jr. and his daughter, Grace Whitney Evans; businessman Dexter M. Ferry; Joseph L. Hudson, founder of the eponymous department store; Fulton Iron Works founder Delos Rice; lumber baron Lucien S. Moore; banker Frederick Butler; merchant John P. Fiske; Dime Savings Bank president William Livingstone Jr.; and dry goods manufacturer Ransom Gillis.

In the 1890s the character of the subdivision began to change, as many prominent members of the local German Jewish community moved to Brush Park. This period of the neighborhood's history is recorded by the neoclassical Temple Beth-El, designed by Albert Kahn for the Reform Congregation and constructed in 1902. Around the same time, Brush Park saw the construction of its first apartment buildings. Some of the neighborhood's earliest examples of this type of structure were the Luben Apartments, built in 1901 by architect Edwin W. Gregory and demolished in 2010, and the Alfred Apartments, built in 1903 by architect Alamon C. Varney and demolished in 1930s. These apartments featured large and sumptuous units, and their design blended with those of the surrounding mansions; however, the construction of apartment buildings undoubtedly represented a decrease in the quality of Brush Park's building stock.

Decline
The neighborhood began to decline at the turn of the 20th century, when the advent of streetcars and then automobiles allowed prosperous citizens to live farther from downtown: early residents moved out, notably to up-and-coming districts such as Indian Village and Boston–Edison, and Brush Park became less fashionable. The Woodward Avenue frontage rapidly lost its residential character, as the lavish mansions were demolished to make way for commercial buildings; those that survived were demolished in the 1935 Woodward widening. Throughout the subdivision, homes were converted to apartments or rooming houses – often with the construction of two- and three-story rear additions – to accommodate workers of the booming automobile industry, and dozens of structures were razed for surface parking lots. By 1921, all of the homes on Alfred Street were apartments or rooming houses.

By the 1930s many African Americans had moved into the area; as a result, Brush Park became home to a vibrant black community, together with the nearby Black Bottom–Paradise Valley area. African American institutions located in Brush Park included St. Peter Claver, the first Catholic parish for African Americans in Detroit, established in 1914 in the former St. Mary's Episcopal church at Beaubien and Eliot; the Most Worshipful Mt. Sinai Grand Lodge, a black masonic lodge located at 312 Watson; and the Mercy General Hospital and Clinic. Mercy Hospital was the first black-owned hospital in Detroit; founded by Dr. David Northcross in 1917, it was originally located at 248 Winder Street, and later relocated to 668 Winder.

The Great Depression and the racial tensions of the 1940s (part of the 1943 race riot took place in the streets of Brush Park) led to a rapid deterioration of the neighborhood. Longtime resident Russell McLauchlin described Brush Park's decline in the preface to his book Alfred Street (1946):

[Alfred Street] is now in what city-planners call a blighted area. The elms were long ago cut down. No representative of the old neighbor families remains. The houses, mostly standing as they stood a half-century ago, are dismal structures. Some have night-blooming grocery stores in their front yards. Some have boarded windows. All stand in bitter need of paint and repair. It is a desolate street; a scene of poverty and chop-fallen gloom; possibly of worse things.

Starting in the 1960s, many of the buildings became unoccupied and fell into disrepair; however, the neighborhood maintained much of its historical integrity, and some attempts were made to preserve it. The first serious redevelopment plan in Brush Park's history was the Woodward East Renaissance project, planned to be completed in 1976, America's bicentennial year. The ambitious plan included restoring the surviving historic mansions and erecting modern residential buildings on the empty lots, but it was left unrealized due to disorganization. The area bounded by Alfred, Brush, Watson, and John R. Streets, named Woodward East Historic District, was designated a Michigan State Historic Site on September 17, 1974, and listed on the National Register of Historic Places on January 21, 1975; the larger Brush Park Historic District, bounded by Woodward, Mack, Beaubien, and the Fisher Freeway, was established by the City of Detroit on January 23, 1980. Despite these attempts to save what was left of the neighborhood's historic character, by the 1980s Brush Park had gradually fallen into a state of "nearly total abandonment and disintegration," gaining a poor reputation as one of Detroit's most derelict areas. Abandoned buildings became targets for vandals and arsonists: as a result, dozens of structures were demolished by the city for security reasons. During the 19th century, around 300 homes were built in Brush Park, including 70 Victorian mansions; at present, about 80 original structures remain in the area. Notable buildings that were demolished include the Woodward Avenue Baptist Church (1887), destroyed by fire in 1986, and St. Patrick Catholic Church (1862), destroyed by fire in 1993.

Revival
Brush Park's revival began in the 1990s and has since accelerated. Several historic houses were stabilized and "mothballed" by the City of Detroit between 2005 and 2006, on the occasion of the Super Bowl XL played at the nearby Ford Field. New condominiums have been built in the southern part of the district, near the Fisher Freeway, and a number of the older mansions have been restored. A handful of buildings still remain in a state of complete neglect, and are threatened with demolition.

The French Renaissance style William Livingstone House (1894) on Eliot Street was one of Kahn's first commissions. The Red Cross intended to demolish the mansion, originally located west of John R. Street, to make way for their new building. Preservationists succeeded in successfully moving the Livingstone House about one block to the east. Nevertheless, after this change of position some serious structural problems concerning the house's foundations caused the gradual collapse of the building. Artist Lowell Boileau commemorated the William Livingstone House in a painting entitled Open House which he unveiled the day of its demolition September 15, 2007, underscoring preservationist efforts.

On May 10, 2014, the historic First Unitarian Church caught fire under suspicious circumstances and was consequently demolished. The building, which was designed by Donaldson and Meier and dated back to 1890, represents one of the greatest losses in Brush Park's recent history, since it was listed on the National Register of Historic Places.

Gallery

Notable buildings

Popular Culture 
The Ransom Gillis house appeared in the intro of the movie Beverly Hills Cop (1984), Four Brothers (2005) and Batman vs Superman (2016).

The J.P Donaldson house was featured in Only Lovers Left Alive (2014)

The Frederick Butler house largely inspired Count Olaf's house in Netflix's Series of Unfortunate Events (2017)

Education
Brush Park is within the Detroit Public Schools district. Residents are zoned to Spain Elementary School for K-8, while they are zoned to Martin Luther King High School (9-12) for high school.

References
Notes

Bibliography

External links
Revitalization in Brush Park
 Dan Gilbert plans 337 new townhouses and apartments for Brush Park.—Detroit Free Press, May 7, 2015
 Detroit’s First Major Residential Development in Decades Blends Historic Preservation and New Construction in Brush Park.—City of Detroit, Press Release May 6, 2015
 Detroit Announces Plan to Preserve Iconic Brewster Wheeler Rec Center and Start Rebuilding Historic Neighborhood.—City of Detroit, Press Release April 14, 2015
 More higher-end apartments planned for Midtown, The Scott @ Brush Park.—Detroit Free Press, March 23, 2015

Historic districts in Detroit
Midtown Detroit
Neighborhoods in Detroit
Historic districts on the National Register of Historic Places in Michigan
Michigan State Historic Sites in Wayne County, Michigan
National Register of Historic Places in Detroit
Houses in Detroit